Bagmati Zone was one of the fourteen zones of Nepal, comprising eight districts, namely, Bhaktapur, Lalitpur, Kathmandu, Dhading, Kavrepalanchok, Nuwakot, Rasuwa and Sindhupalchowk. Here is district wise List of Monuments which is in the Bagmati Zone.

Bagmati Zone
 List of monuments in Bhaktapur District
 List of monuments in Dhading District 
 List of monuments in Kathmandu District
 List of monuments in Kavrepalanchok District
 List of monuments in Lalitpur District
 List of monuments in Nuwakot District 
 List of monuments in Rasuwa District 
 List of monuments in Sindhupalchok District

References

Bagmati Zone
Bagmati Zone